Grand Central Station may refer to:
Grand Central Terminal, a major station in New York City, commonly called "Grand Central Station"
Grand Central–42nd Street (New York City Subway), a New York City Subway station complex at Grand Central Terminal
Grand Central Madison station, a Long Island Rail Road station complex under Grand Central Terminal
Grand Central Station (1900–1910), a station that was located on the site of Grand Central Terminal from 1900 to 1910
Grand Central (IRT elevated station), a former New York City elevated station (1878–1923)
Birmingham New Street railway station, England, also known as Grand Central station
Grand Central Station (Chicago), a former train station (1890-1969)
Grand Central Station (radio series), a radio series running from (1937-1954)

See also
Grand Central (disambiguation)
Grand station (disambiguation)
Graham Central Station